Beverly ("Bev") Oden (born March 19, 1971 in Millington, Tennessee) is a volleyball player from the United States. She played middle blocker for the U.S women's volleyball team in the 1996 Summer Olympics in Atlanta, Georgia.

Oden played volleyball for Stanford University and was named the 1990 AVCA Player of the Year. Oden's sister, Kim was also the AVCA Player of the Year (1985) playing for Stanford. Middle sister Elaina played for University of the Pacific.  All three were Olympians.

Oden was the first to be named to the AVCA All-America First-Team all four years of her collegiate eligibility (1989–1992). In 1991, she won the Honda-Broderick Award (now the Honda Sports Award) as the nation's best female collegiate volleyball player.

Beverly Oden made the news in May 2007 when she was held in custody by Orange County sheriff deputies near her hometown of Irvine, California in relation to a reported incident. The Olympic volleyball player was released after being questioned and spending an hour inside a police car. Oden was found to have no connection with the incident in question and her ordeal prompted local community leaders to form the Oden Commission to hold discussions on racial profiling between residents and law enforcement.

Beverly Oden is currently working as the Volleyball Guide for the popular website About.com.  She is the author of numerous articles on volleyball and also releases a weekly e-mail newsletter.

References

External links
Team USA - 1996 Olympic Volleyball Teams
Beverly Oden Bio
Profile
About.com Volleyball
Beverley Oden Bio at About.com

1971 births
American women's volleyball players
Living people
Volleyball players at the 1996 Summer Olympics
Sportspeople from Irvine, California
People from Millington, Tennessee
Stanford Cardinal women's volleyball players
Middle blockers
Olympic volleyball players of the United States
Competitors at the 1994 Goodwill Games
Goodwill Games medalists in volleyball
Pan American Games medalists in volleyball
Pan American Games silver medalists for the United States
Medalists at the 1995 Pan American Games